Spanish Flat, California may refer to:
 Spanish Flat, El Dorado County, California
 Spanish Flat, Napa County, California

See also